Clear Lake Shores is a city in Galveston County, Texas, within the Houston–Sugar Land–Baytown metropolitan area. As of the 2010 census, the city population was 1,063.

History
During the oil boom years of the 1920s, developers began to sell properties around the Clear Lake estuary as waterfront recreational retreats. The new development was named "Clear Lake Shores". Though the development was initially successful, the Great Depression halted most of the area's growth.

After World War II the area began to redevelop with increasing numbers of permanent residents (as opposed to simply weekend residents). The town incorporated in 1962 and has since continued to be primarily residential with a small, tourism-focused business community.

In September 2008, the eye of Hurricane Ike hit and destroyed many homes.

Geography

Clear Lake Shores is located at  (29.546493, –95.032605) and is part of the Clear Lake Area.

All Clear Lake Shores addresses share the 77565 zip code with the city of Kemah.

Demographics

2020 census

As of the 2020 United States census, there were 1,258 people, 632 households, and 341 families residing in the city.

2000 census
As of the census of 2000, there were 1,205 people, 590 households, and 338 families residing in the city. The population density was 2,581.9 people per square mile (989.9/km2). There were 661 housing units at an average density of 1,416.3 per square mile (543.0/km2). The racial makeup of the city was 1143 (94.85%) White, 4 (0.33%) African American, 4 (0.33%) Native American, 9 (0.75%) Asian, 12 (1.00%) from other races, and 33 (2.74%) from two or more races. Hispanic or Latino of any race were 40 (3.32%) of the population.

There were 590 households, out of which 20.5% had children under the age of 18 living with them, 45.8% were married couples living together, 7.1% had a female householder with no husband present, and 42.7% were non-families. 35.4% of all households were made up of individuals, and 6.3% had someone living alone who was 65 years of age or older. The average household size was 2.04 and the average family size was 2.60.

In the city, the population was spread out, with 16.7% under the age of 18, 5.1% from 18 to 24, 29.5% from 25 to 44, 40.0% from 45 to 64, and 8.8% who were 65 years of age or older. The median age was 44 years. For every 100 females, there were 103.9 males. For every 100 females age 18 and over, there were 108.3 males.

The median income for a household in the city was $67,500, and the median income for a family was $86,450. Males had a median income of $65,375 versus $41,563 for females. The per capita income for the city was $41,347. About 3.0% of families and 4.2% of the population were below the poverty line, including 0.5% of those under age 18 and 7.5% of those age 65 or over.

Government and infrastructure
Clear Lake Shores has a police department. The Kemah Volunteer Fire Department, with its facility in Kemah, serves Clear Lake Shores.

Education
Clear Lake Shores is served by the Clear Creek Independent School District. The community is within the Board of Trustees District 1, represented by Laura DuPont 

Pupils are zoned to Stewart Elementary School (formerly Kemah Elementary School) in Kemah, Bayside Intermediate School in League City, and Clear Falls High School in League City. Previously residents were zoned to  League City Intermediate School in League City, and Clear Creek High School in League City.

Residents of the Galveston County portion of Clear Creek ISD (and therefore Clear Lake Shores) are zoned to the College of the Mainland, a community college in Texas City.

See also
 Clear Lake (region)

References

External links
 Clear Lake Shores
 Handbook of Texas Online article

Cities in Texas
Cities in Galveston County, Texas
Greater Houston
Populated coastal places in Texas